The 81st World Science Fiction Convention (Worldcon) will be held on 18–22 October 2023 at the Chengdu Science Fiction Museum (or Chengdu Science Museum) in Chengdu, China.The convention was organized by Chengdu Science Fiction Society(CSFS) and was co-chaired by Ben Yalow、Shi Chen、Xi He

Participants

Guests of Honor 

 Cixin Liu (writer)
 Sergey Lukianenko (writer)
 Robert J. Sawyer (writer)

Awards 

The awards will be announced at the convention.

Site selection 

The following committees announced bids for hosting the convention:

 Chengdu 2023
 Memphis in 2023 (cancelled in October 2021)
 Nice 2023 (cancelled in July 2020)
 Winnipeg in 2023

The site was selected by members of the 79th World Science Fiction Convention.

See also 

 Hugo Award
 Science fiction
 Speculative fiction
 World Science Fiction Society
 Worldcon

References

External links 

 
 
 List of current Worldcon bids

2023 conferences
Worldcon